Joubert Park is a suburb of Johannesburg, South Africa. It is located in Region 8. The suburb shares its name with the largest park in the Central Business District, which is located a few blocks from the main train station for the city (known as Park Station in the early years).

Joubert Park is the location of the Johannesburg Art Gallery.

References

Johannesburg Region F
Suburbs of Johannesburg